Europe Sails is an Austrian aircraft manufacturer, based in Neukirchen am Großvenediger. The company specializes in hang gliders.

In 2003 the company offered a complete line of four types of hang gliders, but by 2012 the Independent competition hang glider was their sole product.

Aircraft

References

External links

Aircraft manufacturers of Austria
Hang gliders
Ultralight trikes